Fraunhofer may refer to:

Joseph von Fraunhofer (1787–1826), German physicist
Fraunhofer (crater), a lunar crater
Fraunhofer Society (Fraunhofer-Gesellschaft), a large German research organization
Fraunhofer diffraction, far-field diffraction
Fraunhofer lines, spectral lines of the Sun
Fraunhofer distance, between near field and far field